Orlando Hinton Asbury (September 6, 1897 – September 13, 1991) was an American baseball pitcher in the Negro leagues. He played with the Lincoln Giants in 1924.

References

External links
 and Seamheads

Lincoln Giants players
1897 births
1991 deaths
Sportspeople from Brooklyn
Baseball players from New York City
Baseball pitchers
20th-century African-American sportspeople